Lebidia is a genus of beetles in the family Carabidae, containing the following species:

 Lebidia bioculata A. Morawitz, 1863
 Lebidia dhankutani Kirschenhofer, 1994
 Lebidia formosana Kano, 1929
 Lebidia octocelis Andrewes, 1924
 Lebidia octoguttata A. Morawitz, 1862

References

Lebiinae